Locus Technologies is an American corporation with headquarters in Mountain View, California. Locus provides software and services to track, organize, visualize, and report environmental and ESG data.

Profile
Locus Technologies is known for its Environmental Information Management (EIM) and Locus Platform (LP) applications. Locus centralizes corporate environmental and sustainability information through the Locus cloud—fully powered by Amazon Web Services.

Locus Technologies was founded in April 1997 by Neno Duplan. Locus pioneered the cross section of information management software and mobile technology for environmental data collection by offering an application called eWell in 2001.

Software and Services

Locus EIM 

Locus’ Environmental Information Management (EIM) software is a cloud-based environmental data management system released in 1999. It is currently used to manage and report on the data associated with nuclear, mining, water quality, remediation, and upstream oil and gas activities.

Locus Platform

Locus Platform was released in 2013. The cloud-based software consolidates data into one platform, with configurable modules used for varying business-specific needs. LP handles tracking, management, and reporting of sustainability, compliance, health & safety, air and greenhouse gases, waste, and water quality information. It unifies all ESG reporting and EHS compliance on the single platform.

Locus Mobile

Locus Mobile is application that offers the capability to collect and upload field data remotely. It incorporates with Locus EIM and Locus Platform.

Greenhouse Gases Verification 
Locus is the only software vendor that is an approved greenhouse gas (GHG) verification body under the California Air Resources Board (CARB). Locus has been an accredited GHG verifier since 2010.

Locus is also known for its GHG calculator, which is offered at no cost to companies for determining whether they meet the threshold requirements necessary to report their emissions data to the California Air Resources Board under (AB) 32, and specifically 95101(b)(8) legislation.

Low Carbon Fuel Standard Verification 

As of January 2020, Locus was announced among the first accredited third-party Low-carbon fuel standard (LCFS) verification bodies for the program administered by the California Air Resources Board.

Awards

Locus has received awards for 16 consecutive years from Environmental Business Journal for achievement among IT companies.

Locus has also been recognized in independent market research reports such as the 2013 Green Quadrant® Sustainability Management Software, July 2013 report by Verdantix. They were highlighted as offering, "the best-in-class solution for geographic information capture." Verdantix also stated that, "The software offers full data capture and management capabilities integrated with mapping tools, displaying full environmental and sustainability data on a web-based, interactive GIS system."

References

Companies based in Mountain View, California
Technology companies of the United States
1997 establishments in California
Technology companies based in California
Information technology companies of the United States
American companies established in 1997
Privately held companies based in California
Software companies of the United States
Software companies based in California
Software companies established in 1997